The Jenštejn family ( or z Jenštejna) was branch of the family of Jan Očko of Vlašim and his brothers Michael and 

Pavel of Vlašim was listed in 1360 as a royal notary and given Jenštejn Castle in 1368. He used surname z Jenštejna and was founder of branch Jenštejnští. He had four sons: Martin, Jan, Pavel and Václav. The most important was Jan of Jenštejn, who following the resignation of his uncle Jan Očko became Prague Archbishop in 1378.

Vaněk of Jenštejn, son of Pavel of Jenštejn, was the owner of castles Bradlec and Staré Hrady near Jičín. Vaněk rebelled against the King Wenceslaus IV and Bradlec was taken by the royal army in 1417. His son Mikuláš (+ 1459) was the last lord of Jenštejn.

The coat of arms of the Jenštejn family is gules two vulture heads on a silver background.

Reference Links
 

Medieval Bohemian nobility